Newport State Airport may refer to:

 Newport State Airport (Rhode Island) in Middletown (near Newport), Rhode Island, United States
 Newport State Airport (Vermont) in Newport, Vermont, United States

See also 

 Newport Municipal Airport (disambiguation)